Friend is an unincorporated community in Terry Township, Finney County, Kansas, United States.  It is located next to U.S. Route 83 and the North Line of the Garden City Western Railway, south to the county line of Scott County.

History
Originally the town was named McCue after Basil M. McCue of Hastings, Nebraska who was the organizer of the Garden City Gulf & Northern Railroad. The Santa Fe Railroad changed the name to Friend when it took over the railway line between Garden City and Scott City.

The post office in Friend closed in 1992.

Education
The community is served by Garden City USD 457 public school district.

References

Further reading

External links
 Historical Directory of Kansas Towns (M)
 Basil M. McCue at A Standard History of Kansas and Kansans
 Finney County maps: Current, Historic, KDOT

Unincorporated communities in Finney County, Kansas
Unincorporated communities in Kansas